Almílcar Jesús Romero Portuondo (born 16 October 1948) is an agronomist and politician from the Dominican Republic. He is Senator for the province of Duarte, elected in 2006, and re-elected in 2010.

Invested Doctor Honoris Causa in 2006 by the Universidad Católica Nordestana.

References 

Living people
1948 births
People from Duarte Province
Dominican Liberation Party politicians
Members of the Senate of the Dominican Republic
Dominican Republic people of Basque descent
Web oficial